In males, ejaculation is the ejection of semen from the reproductory tract.

Ejaculation may also refer to:

 Female ejaculation
 Facial, a sex act in which a man ejaculates semen onto the face of one or more sexual partners
 Ejaculatory prayer, or ejaculation, a very short emotional prayer
 "Ejaculation", the first episode of Big Mouth